The Voice of Poland (season 8) began airing on 2 September 2017 on TVP 2. It aired on Saturdays at 20:05 and 21:10.

Tomson & Baron, Andrzej Piaseczny and Maria Sadowska returned as coaches, while Michał Szpak replaced Natalia Kukulska.

Coaches and Hosts

Tomson & Baron, Maria Sadowska and Andrzej Piaseczny return as coaches for the 8th edition. Michał Szpak replace the role of jurors Natalia Kukulska, who resigned from the post of judges in a professional capacity. Moderators Tomasz Kammel and Maciej Musiał Alongside Marcelina   Zawadzka and Barbara Kurdej Szatan

Teams
Color key

Blind auditions

Color keys

Episode 1 (September 2)

Episode 2 (September 2) 
Sadowska did not get any act in this episode, and this is one common episode in which the last contestant gets rejected.

Episode 3 (September 9)

Episode 4 (September 9) 
Tomson & Baron did not get any acts in this episode.

Episode 5 (September 23)

Episode 6 (September 23)

Episode 7 (September 24)

Episode 8 (September 24)

Episode 9 (September 30)

Episode 10 (September 30)

The Battle Rounds

The same mechanics from the last season was implemented in this season's battle rounds. The winner advanced to the knockouts, while the loser is available to steal. The "hot chairs" once returned. If a coach has stolen one artist but later decides to steal another, the first artist will be replaced and eliminated by the newly-stolen artist. Same with the last season, each coach can steal up to three times. The battles therefore end with seven participants advancing to the next stage from each team, with six artists won in the battles and one stolen artist from other coaches' teams.

Color keys

The Knockout Round

Episode 14 (October 28)
Knockouts took place on 28 October 2017.

Color keys

Live Shows

Color keys

Episode 15 (November 4)

Episode 16 - Quarter-Final (November 11)

Episode 17 - Semifinal (18 November)

Episode 18 - Final (November 25)

Result details

Results summary of live shows
Color keys
Artist's info

Result details

Team
Artist's info

Result details

The Voice of Poland
2017 Polish television seasons